Beaumont High School may refer to:

United States
 Beaumont High School (Beaumont, California), a public high school in Beaumont, California
 Beaumont School (Ohio), a Catholic, all-girl high school in Cleveland Heights, Ohio
 Beaumont High School (St. Louis), a public high school in St. Louis, Missouri
 Beaumont High School (Beaumont, Texas) a former high school in Beaumont, Texas

Canada
 Beaumont Composite High School, Beaumont, Alberta

See also
Beaumont Independent School District, Beaumont, Texas

Educational institution disambiguation pages